Smith & Jones is the brand name of instant noodles & sauces manufactured and distributed by Capital Foods Ltd India.

Noodle flavors
The noodles are available in the following flavours:
Smith & Jones masala flavour: (blend of various Indian spices)
Smith & Jones curry flavour
Capital Foods also manufactures various other Chinese flavours under the brand name Ching's Secret:
Manchurian
Hot Garlic
Szechwan

Competitors
Maggi noodles and Nissin instant noodles are the top rivals in this market segment.

References

External links
 
 Capital Foods Ltd India's website

Instant noodle brands
Indian brands